Two two may refer to:

 Two Two (투투), a Korean pop group
 Jacob Two-Two, a fictional character in several books, films, and a TV series

See also
 2 (disambiguation)
 2+2 (disambiguation)
 2/2 (disambiguation)
 Tootoo
 Tutu (disambiguation)
 Two & Two (2011 film)
 Two by Two (disambiguation)
 Two by Twos
 Two for Two
 Two Two Two